Hollow Knight: Silksong is an upcoming Metroidvania video game developed and published by Team Cherry for Windows, macOS, Linux, PlayStation 4, PlayStation 5, Nintendo Switch, Xbox One, and Xbox Series X/S. It was originally announced on 14 February 2019, as a sequel to the 2017 game Hollow Knight and is aimed to be released before 12 June 2023.

Gameplay

Hollow Knight: Silksong is a 2D Metroidvania game, which takes place in a haunted kingdom inhabited by bugs.

The gameplay is largely similar to that of its predecessor Hollow Knight, with an increased emphasis on speed, combat, and platforming. The player controls Hornet, an insectoid creature who wields a needle to combat enemies and had previously appeared as a boss in the first game. During her adventure, Hornet encounters many hostile creatures. The game is planned to feature over 165 different enemies. Hornet will also encounter many friendly non-player characters.

Silksong will feature a quest system, in which characters will ask Hornet to fulfil certain requests. The quest system is broken up into at least four sections: Hunt, Gather, Wayfarer, and Grand Hunt. In a feature new to Silksong, Hornet will be able to craft weapons, tools, and traps from gathered materials.

The checkpoint system from the first game will return in Silksong.

Instead of using soul to heal like the Knight from Hollow Knight did, Hornet uses silk. She can near instantly heal three masks of damage on the move instead of needing to stop and slowly heal one mask at a time like the Knight, which could put it in danger from receiving more damage. However, this depletes her entire bar of silk. This change was meant to increase the pace of the game, and allow the developers to make the game more difficult than Hollow Knight. Upon death, instead of leaving a Shade like the Knight did, Hornet instead leaves a bundle of silk that refills some or all silk notches in her bar when broken.

Silksong will have an additional difficulty mode with permanent death called "Silk Soul mode" like the "Steel Soul mode" found in Hollow Knight. It will feature more differences from the base game than "Steel Soul mode" made in Hollow Knight, though the extent of the changes is not currently known.

Premise
Hornet is captured and taken to the unknown kingdom of Pharloom, which is said to be "haunted by Silk and Song", and must climb to the top to reach a shining citadel.

Development
Hollow Knight: Silksong was announced on 14 February 2019 in a trailer and with a developer diary video sharing more information about the game. Since announcement, per GameSpot, "updates have been sporadic and infrequent".

Originally, Hornet was planned as a second playable character to be included in a downloadable content (DLC) pack for Hollow Knight, funded as a stretch goal in the game's Kickstarter campaign. Eventually, due to the increased scope of the project Team Cherry decided to expand the DLC to a full sequel. While in the process, Team Cherry revealed some of the character animations for Hornet and Steel Assassin Sharpe, a villain from the game.

The developers released an update about the game in March 2019, sharing descriptions and images of characters who will appear in Silksong. They thanked the game's fans for supporting them regarding the announcement of the sequel. Team Cherry presented a 16-minute playable demo of the game at E3 2019 that featured two new areas: Deep Docks and Moss Grotto.

In December 2019, Team Cherry released a preview of the game's soundtrack, composed by Christopher Larkin, as well as an update on the total number of enemies developed, with a focus on a trio, described as "members of a scholarly suite."

In a February 2022 PC Gamer article, Team Cherry co-director William Pellen confirmed the game was still in development despite the lack of updates since December 2019 and said that more details about the game would be revealed as the game got closer to its release.

In June 2022, a new trailer for the game was revealed at the Xbox & Bethesda Games Showcase 2022, revealing that the game would be released on Xbox Game Pass at launch, with the game being available through the service for PC and Xbox Series X/S. While no release date was announced, Xbox stated in a tweet that the game would be available within the next twelve months, before 12 June 2023.

In September 2022, Sony confirmed in a tweet that the game would also come to PlayStation 4 and PlayStation 5.

In May 2022, Hollow Knight: Silksong won a "Most Anticipated Game" award from Unity. In response, Team Cherry thanked the community for their support and said "It can't be too much longer, surely!"

References

External links

Upcoming video games scheduled for 2023
Dark fantasy video games
Indie video games
Linux games
MacOS games
Metroidvania games
Platform games
Nintendo Switch games
Single-player video games
Video games featuring female protagonists
Video games developed in Australia
Video games scored by Christopher Larkin (composer)
Video game sequels
Windows games
Xbox Series X and Series S games